Rhadiurgus variabilis  is a species of robber fly in the family Asilidae found in the Holarctic region.

References

External links
Geller Grim Robberflies of Germany
Images representing Rhadiurgus variabilis

Brachyceran flies of Europe
Asilidae
Insects described in 1838